The Imagine Peace Tower ("the peace column") is a memorial to John Lennon from his widow, Yoko Ono, located on Viðey Island in Kollafjörður Bay near Reykjavík, Iceland. Installed in 2007, it consists of a tall tower of light, projected from a white stone monument that has the words "Imagine Peace" carved into it in 24 languages. These words, and the name of the tower, are a reference to Lennon's campaign for peace, and his song "Imagine".

Description
The Tower consists of 15 searchlights with prisms that act as mirrors, reflecting the column of light vertically into the sky from a 10-metre wide wishing well. It often reaches cloudbase and indeed can be seen penetrating the cloud cover. On a clear night, it appears to reach an altitude of at least 4,000 metres. The power for the lights is provided by Iceland's unique geothermal energy grid. It uses approximately 75 kW of power.

Buried underneath the light tower are over 1 million written wishes that Ono gathered over the years for another project called Wish Trees. Iceland was selected for the project because of its beauty and its eco-friendly use of geothermal energy.

Construction
Construction of the tower started on 9 October 2006, on what would have been Lennon's 66th birthday when Ono dedicated the location, and it was officially unveiled on the same date in 2007. The ceremony was broadcast internationally to numerous television networks. In attendance with Ono were son Sean Lennon, bandmate Ringo Starr, Olivia Harrison, widow of George Harrison, and Olivia's son Dhani Harrison. Paul McCartney was invited, but could not attend due to a court case. Ono said on the day of the inauguration that the tower was the best thing that she and John had ever done.

Operation
The tower is lit every year from 9 October, Lennon's birthday, through 8 December, the date he was shot, from 31 December until 6 January (an Icelandic new year period), and for one week around the spring equinox.

On 9 October 2021, it was lit for the 15th time on John Lennon's birthday. The monument was lit on 24 February 2022, with Ono saying the off-season lighting was "to show solidarity with Ukraine and emphasize the call for peace."

Languages on the tower 

The words on the tower are written in 24 world languages:

An additional panel reads:

See also

References

External links 

 
 "How far into the sky does the light from Yoko Ono's Peace Tower travel?" at the University of Iceland's Science Web.

Yoko Ono
Monuments and memorials in Iceland
Peace monuments and memorials
Monuments and memorials to John Lennon
Searchlights
Light art
2007 establishments in Iceland